Julio César "Gatito" Félix (born 11 September 1985) is a Mexican former professional boxer who competed from 2007 to 2013. He challenged for the WBO junior flyweight title in 2012.

Professional career
On 2 June 2012, Félix was defeated by Moisés Fuentes via first-round knockout for the WBO junior flyweight title.

References

External links
 

Living people
1988 births
Mexican male boxers
Mini-flyweight boxers
Boxers from Mexico City